The NDN Firecracker is a single-engine aircraft designed as a military trainer.

Design and development

In 1976, Nigel Desmond Norman, one of the founders of Britten-Norman, the manufacturers of the Islander, set up NDN Aircraft to build the Firecracker, a single piston-engined trainer designed to replicate the handling of a jet trainer. It was intended that the Firecracker would have a simple structure to allow it to be built under license by third-world countries to help start up local aviation industries. The first prototype, powered by a Lycoming O-540 piston engine, flew on 26 May 1977.

The aircraft configuration is a tandem two-seat aircraft with retractable tricycle landing gear. It has a low aspect ratio wing in order to give fighter-like handling and is fitted with an airbrake.

After producing a single piston-engined prototype, NDN developed the aircraft by fitting a Pratt & Whitney Canada PT6 turboprop engine, producing the NDN-1T Turbo-Firecracker. Three NDN-1Ts were built for a British commercial flying school, Specialist Flying Training, which used them for contract training of foreign military students, the first one flying on 1 September 1983. The Firecracker was entered into the competition to replace the BAC Jet Provosts used by Britain's Royal Air Force as a basic trainer, it being proposed to fit the aircraft for the RAF with a more powerful engine and ejection seats. Although the Firecracker, which was planned to be built by Hunting Group if successful, was one of the four shortlisting aircraft, (the others being the Pilatus PC-9, Embraer Tucano and AAC A20 Wamira), ultimately a much modified version of the Tucano, the Shorts Tucano was chosen.

Although NDN, which renamed itself the Norman Aircraft Company (NAC) in 1985, continued to try to sell the Firecracker, no further production ensued, and NAC went into receivership in 1988.

Specifications (Turbo Firecracker)

See also

References

Notes

Bibliography

Barnett, Cliff. "Firecracker: trainer for tomorrow?". Flight International, 31 March 1984. pp. 899–902.
Donald, David (editor).The Encyclopedia of World Aircraft. Leicester, UK:Blitz, 1997. .
 Field, Hugh. "Firecracker in the air". Flight International, 17 March 1979. pp. 831–834.
 Parker, Ian "Early delivery set for Turbo-Firecracker".  Flight International, 17 September 1983. pp. 738–739.
Taylor, J.W.R.(editor) Jane's All the World's Aircraft 1988-1989. Coulsdon, Surrey, UK: Jane's Information Group, 1988. .
"Firecracker". Flight International, 23 July 1977. pp. 275–279.
"Turboprops form RAF Trainer Shortlist". Flight International, 24 March 1984. p. 741
"Shorts Awarded Trainer Contract". Flight International, 30 March 1985, pp. 8–9.
"Norman calls in receiver". Flight International, 6 August 1988, p. 11.

External links

 NTPS
NAC (NDN) Firecracker et Turbo Firecracker

1970s British military trainer aircraft
Firecracker
Single-engined tractor aircraft
Single-engined turboprop aircraft
Low-wing aircraft
Aircraft first flown in 1977
Firecracker